is a Japanese company that manufactures karate uniforms, belts, and related products. It is the world's oldest  manufacturer of uniforms specifically for karate training, with a reputation for both high quality and high price. Tokaido is based in Tokyo, Japan, and is owned and operated by the Sugiura family.

History
Tokaido's founder, Shizuo Sugiura, was a martial arts enthusiast who would watch demonstrations and competitions of many Japanese martial arts. With time, he became increasingly interested in the art of karate. At the time, karate practitioners would simply use judo uniforms or other clothing for training. Judo emphasizes grappling, so training in that art typically requires a strong, heavy uniform; karate emphasizes striking, so training in that art does not require so heavy a uniform. Sugiura was already working in the clothing industry, and decided to combine his work with his interest in karate by producing uniforms specifically for karate training.

In 1958, Sugiura established the Tokaido company. Its name means Eastern Sea Shop in Japanese, and comes from the name of Sugiura's home region on the east coast of Honshū island. Sugiura began supplying sample uniforms to instructors of the newly formed Japan Karate Association (JKA), and used their feedback to improve the designs and manufacturing. The JKA helped popularize the Tokaido brand amongst Shotokan karate practitioners; the karate masters who appear in Masatoshi Nakayama's series of Best Karate textbooks were wearing Tokaido uniforms.

Current status
Tokaido produces two main styles of karate uniform: a standard version used more for regular training and kata (patterns) competition, and a lighter version used more for kumite (sparring) competition. The uniforms and belts are cut and sewn by hand. Apart from uniforms and belts, the company provides embroidery of Japanese words (such as individual practitioners' or karate schools' names) and rank markings, and also produces badges and labels matching major karate organizations. Tokaido has also produced custom-made uniforms made by master tailors Genzo and Waisetsu. These items are available only to karate practitioners ranked 3rd dan or higher.

The company is owned and operated by the Sugiura brothers, sons of the founder. It has headquarters in Kōjimachi, a suburb of Tokyo, and a factory in Nagoya. Tokaido has an international office in the United States of America, and several offices and sales outlets in Japan.

See also
 Kabushiki gaisha
 Karate gi
 Uniform

Notes

a.

b.  Others have attempted to profit from the company's reputation by producing fake Tokaido uniforms. At least one retailer has published a guide to distinguishing between real and fake Tokaido uniforms.

References

External links
Tokaido Japan Direct International 
Tokaido Japan 
Tokaido Karate Gi Uniforms
TOKAIDO Distributor in Portugal

Japanese companies established in 1958
Clothing companies established in 1958
Clothing companies of Japan
Manufacturing companies based in Tokyo
Karate
Sportswear brands